This is a list of diplomatic missions of Bhutan. The landlocked and isolationist Himalayan kingdom of Bhutan has a very limited number of diplomatic missions abroad.

As of 2022, Bhutan operates 6 embassies, 3 consulates, and 2 permanent missions.

Missions

Individual countries

Multilateral organizations

Gallery

See also
 Foreign relations of Bhutan
 List of diplomatic missions in Bhutan
 Visa policy of  Bhutan

References

Bibliography

External links
Ministry of Foreign Affairs of Bhutan (official site)

Foreign relations of Bhutan
Bhutan
Diplomatic missions